Matthew Paul Walker is an English scientist and professor of neuroscience and psychology at the University of California, Berkeley. He is a public intellectual focused on the subject of sleep.

As an academic, Walker has focused on the impact of sleep on human health. He has contributed to many scientific research studies.

Walker became a public intellectual following the publication of Why We Sleep, his first work of popular science, in 2017. It became an international bestseller.

Early life and education
Walker was born in Liverpool, England, and was raised in that city and Chester. Walker graduated with a degree in neuroscience from University of Nottingham in 1996. He received a Ph.D. in neurophysiology from Newcastle University in 1999, where his research was funded by the Medical Research Council (MRC) Neurochemical Pathology Unit.

Career and research
Walker has spent most of his career working in the United States.

Harvard University
In June 2004, Walker became an assistant professor of psychiatry at Harvard Medical School. In one experiment he conducted in October 2002, he trained people to type a complex series of keys on a computer keyboard as quickly as possible. One group started in the morning and the other started in the evening, with a 12-hour time interval for each group respectively. He and his colleagues found that those who were tested in the evening first and re-tested after getting a good night's sleep improved their performance significantly without a loss of accuracy compared to their counterparts.

University of California, Berkeley
Since then, Walker left Harvard in July 2007 and has taught as a professor of neuroscience and psychology at the University of California, Berkeley. Walker is the founder and director of the Center for Human Sleep Science, which is located in UC Berkeley's department of psychology, in association with the Helen Wills Neuroscience Institute and the Henry H. Wheeler Jr. Brain Imaging Center. The organization uses brain imaging methods (MRI, PET scanning), high-density sleep electroencephalography recordings, genomics, proteomics, autonomic physiology, brain stimulation, and cognitive testing to investigate the role of sleep in human health and disease. It researches Alzheimer's disease, Parkinson's disease, cancer, depression, anxiety, insomnia, cardiovascular disease, drug abuse, obesity, and diabetes.

Verily / Google
In 2018, Walker collaborated with research scientists at Project Baseline in developing a sleep diary. Project Baseline is led by Verily (a life sciences research organization of Alphabet Inc.). As of July 2020, Walker states on his website that he is "currently [...] a Sleep Scientist at Google [helping] the scientific exploration of sleep in health and disease."

Why We Sleep

Walker's first book, Why We Sleep: Unlocking the Power of Sleep and Dreams, was published in October 2017. He spent four years writing the book, in which he asserts that sleep deprivation is linked to numerous fatal diseases, including dementia. The book became a #1 Sunday Times Bestseller in the UK, and a New York Times Bestseller in the US. It has also been published in Spanish (¿Por qué dormimos?), by Paidós; and in traditional Mandarin Chinese ("為什麼要睡覺？") in 2019 by 遠見天下文化出版公司 Commonwealth Publishing Group.

Media 
Walker has a highly-rated short-form podcast, The Matt Walker Podcast, focusing on sleep, the brain, and the body. The seven to thirteen minute podcasts have been running since July 2021. Janan Ganesh, writing in the Financial Times, described Walker as, "the world's most famous expert on [sleep]".

Why We Sleep
Why We Sleep was subject to criticism by Alexey Guzey, an independent researcher with a background in economics, in an essay entitled "Matthew Walker's 'Why We Sleep' Is Riddled with Scientific and Factual Errors".

Guzey, together with Andrew Gelman, a statistician at Columbia University, accused Walker of falsification of data in an article published in Chance. Guzey and Gelman argued that "it is unethical to reproduce a graph and remove the one bar in the original graph that contradicts your story". Gelman suggested that the case entered into the territory of "research misconduct".

Walker claimed on numerous occasions, including in Why We Sleep, that the World Health Organization (WHO) had declared, "a global sleep loss epidemic". The WHO denied his claim, and Walker subsequently conceded that his assertion had been "misremembered", and was actually attributable to a claim from the Centers for Disease Control and Prevention in 2014.

Walker failed to disclose that numerous meta-analyses involving over 4 million adults found the lowest mortality was associated with seven hours of sleep, and that the increased risk of death associated with sleeping more than seven hours was significantly greater than the risk of sleeping less than seven hours as defined by a J-shaped curve. Psychologist Stuart J. Ritchie criticised Walker's approach in his book. "Walker could have written a far more cautious book that limited itself to just what the data shows, but perhaps such a book wouldn't have sold so many copies or been hailed as an intervention that 'should change science and medicine'".

Walker responded to criticisms of the book in an online blog post.

Greg Potter of the University of Leeds argued in defence of Walker, commenting on its positive impact: "I do think there are various inaccuracies in it, and I think Guzey points those out effectively. ... I think that the reality is that a lot of people who have read the book will have done things to attend to their sleep hygiene and made some changes in their lifestyles which now support their ability to get better sleep. My guess is the book has probably had a net positive impact."

Article retraction
An article written by Walker published in Neuron in August 2019 was retracted in July 2020, at the request of the author, after it was found to have considerable overlap with an article of his previously published in The Lancet.

Sleep is your superpower
In 2019, Walker gave a 19-minute TED talk entitled Sleep is your superpower. It received more than one million views in the first 72 hours. selected by TED curator, Chris Anderson as one of his top talks of 2019 & to date has been seen more than 14 million times. Markus Loecher, Professor for Mathematics and Statistics at Berlin School of Economics and Law criticised its claims and the veracity of its facts.

References

Living people
Alumni of the University of Nottingham
Harvard Medical School faculty
Scientists from Liverpool
University of California, Berkeley faculty
Year of birth missing (living people)
Alumni of Newcastle University
English expatriates in the United States
English psychologists
English neuroscientists
English science writers